This is a list of films produced by the Tollywood film industry based in Hyderabad in the year 1949.

References

External links
 ghantasalagalamrutamu.blogspot
 Earliest Telugu language films at IMDb.com (114 to 121)

1949
Telugu
Telugu films

te:తెలుగు సినిమాలు